David Cairns (1 March 1959) is an English former professional rugby league footballer who played in the 1970s, 1980s and 1990s.

Background
David Cairns was born in Askam-in-Furness, Lancashire, England.

Playing career

International honours
David Cairns won a cap for England while at Barrow in 1984 against Wales, and won caps for Great Britain while at Barrow in 1984 against France (2 matches).

County honours
David Cairns represented Cumbria from circa-1981 to circa-1986.

County Cup Final appearances
David Cairns played , and was man of the match in Barrow's 12-8 victory over Widnes in the 1983 Lancashire County Cup Final during the 1983–84 season at Central Park, Wigan, on Saturday 1 October 1983, the entire Barrow team was inducted into the Barrow Hall of Fame in 2003, and played  in Salford's 17-22 defeat by Wigan in the 1988 Lancashire County Cup Final during the 1988–89 season at Knowsley Road, St. Helens on Sunday 23 October 1988.

John Player Trophy Final appearances
David Cairns played  in Barrow's 5-12 defeat by Warrington in the 1980–81 John Player Trophy Final during the 1980–81 season at Central Park, Wigan, on Saturday 24 January 1981.

Club career
In 1987, David Cairns was transferred from Barrow for a Salford club record fee, that was fixed by tribunal at £35,000 (based on increases in average earnings, this would be approximately £106,400 in 2013).

Honoured at Barrow Raiders
David Cairns, and Eddie Szymala were both inducted into the Barrow Hall of Fame as individuals in 2010, having previously been inducted as part of 1983–84 Lancashire County Cup winning team in 2003.

References

External links
(archived by web.archive.org) Back on the Wembley trail
(archived by web.archive.org) Barrow RL’s great Britons
(archived by web.archive.org) Cairns and Szymala set for Barrow RL Hall of Fame – again

1959 births
Living people
Barrow Raiders players
Cumbria rugby league team players
England national rugby league team players
English rugby league players
Great Britain national rugby league team players
People from Askam and Ireleth
Rugby league players from Cumbria
Rugby league halfbacks
Rugby league players from Barrow-in-Furness
Salford Red Devils players